Repperndorf is a village in the district of Kitzingen, Regierungsbezirk Lower Franconia, Bavaria, Germany. Formerly an independent municipality, it became part of the town of Kitzingen in January 1978.

References

Kitzingen (district)